Searching for David's Heart is a 1998 young-adult novel by Cherie Bennett. The author is a screenwriter, novelist, playwright, and columnist for the San Diego Union-Tribune and other Copley newspapers.

Plot summary
Darcy Deeton is a twelve-year-old girl who loves her older brother, David. After becoming jealous when he falls in love with Jayne Evans, Darcy inadvertently leads David to his death in a car accident. The Deetons decide to donate David's most important organ, his heart. Darcy is so guilt-ridden about his death that she is determined to find the person who has his heart so she can find some closure. Darcy embarks on a wild adventure with her best friend, Sam. She goes on a journey with Sam and finds the recipient of David's heart, Winston Pawling.

Film adaptation 
Searching for David's Heart was made into a made-for-TV movie that premiered on ABC Family in 2004. It is about a teenage girl, Darcy Deeton (played by Danielle Panabaker), who is dealing with the death of her brother, David. She goes on a journey with her best friend Sam (played by Ricky Ullman) to find the person who received David's heart. In the movie, Darcy's brother is killed after he is hit by a car on his sister Darcy's birthday. Darcy's mother and father decide to donate his heart to a transplant organization.  She and her best friend Sam find out David and the one who received his heart are nothing alike, which becomes very devastating to Darcy. However, the experience helps bring the shattered family back together and start to heal. For her critically acclaimed performance, Panabaker won a Young Artist Award for Best Performance in a TV Movie, Miniseries or Special – Leading Young Actress. The film was directed by Paul Hoen.

References
Cherie Bennett. Searching for David's Heart. (1998)

External links

ABC Family original films
American novels adapted into films
Films based on American novels
Films based on children's books
American young adult novels
2004 television films
2004 films
2000s English-language films
Films directed by Paul Hoen